Aldon Junior Anderson (January 3, 1917 – March 24, 1996) was a United States district judge of the United States District Court for the District of Utah.

Education and career

Born on January 3, 1917, in Salt Lake City, Utah, to Aldon J. and Minnie (Egan), Anderson received a Bachelor of Arts degree from the University of Utah in 1939 and a Juris Doctor from the S.J. Quinney College of Law at the University of Utah in 1943. He was a staff attorney of the Utah State Tax Commission from 1943 to 1945, and was then in private practice in Salt Lake City until 1957, also working as a Utah state district attorney from 1953 to 1957. He was a judge of the second district of the Utah State District Court from 1957 to 1971.

Federal judicial service

On June 17, 1971, President Richard Nixon nominated Anderson to a seat on the United States District Court for the District of Utah vacated by Judge Albert Sherman Christensen. Anderson was confirmed by the United States Senate on July 22, 1971, and received his commission the same day. He served as Chief Judge from 1978 to 1984, assuming senior status on December 20, 1984. Anderson served in this capacity until his death on March 24, 1996 in Salt Lake City.

Personal

Anderson was married to Virginia Weilenmann Anderson, who was a speech therapist for disabled people.

References

Sources
 

1917 births
1996 deaths
Utah state court judges
Judges of the United States District Court for the District of Utah
United States district court judges appointed by Richard Nixon
20th-century American judges
University of Utah alumni
S.J. Quinney College of Law alumni
20th-century American lawyers
District attorneys in Utah